Colaspidea metallica is a species of beetle in the Chrysomelidae family that can be found on the Greek island Corfu and the Italian islands of Sardinia and Sicily. It can also be found in France.

References

Eumolpinae
Beetles described in 1790
Beetles of Europe
Taxa named by Pietro Rossi